This is a list of destinations served by the Chinese carrier Juneyao Air.

Destinations

References 

Juneyao Air